Hamlin Lake is a man-made lake in Michigan enlarged by the backup of the Big Sable River by the Hamlin Lake Dam before it reaches Lake Michigan. It is the largest man-made lake in Michigan. It has two sections, the upper and lower lakes, which are separated by the narrows. The western section has a maximum depth of almost  while the eastern section is only  The first dam was built in the 1850s for a sawmill. Ludington State Park lies along the entire western shore of the lake while the eastern tip of the lake is in the Manistee National Forest.

The lake is great for swimming during summer months as it is typically much warmer than Lake Michigan and has a smaller swimming area, making it easier to keep track of family and friends. Dunes separate the western shore of Hamlin Lake from the eastern shore of Lake Michigan. State park visitors can rent a variety of boats at this location and many of the park's trails (including a canoe trail) begin and end here. During the winter season, ice fishing is popular. Gamefish have been stocked in the lake since the 1890s.

History 
Hamlin lake once was a small town, but in 1888 the wooden dam protecting the town collapsed, flooding the town. The dam was rebuilt in 1912, before collapsing again, flooding the area. It was later incorporated into Ludington State Park in the 1930s.

It is the largest man-made lake in Michigan.

See also 
List of lakes in Michigan

References
https://hamlinlake.com/stories/history_of_the_village_of_hamlin_michigan

https://www.michigan.gov/documents/dnr/2012-132_394439_7.pdf

External links

Hamlin Lake, Michigan DNR
Hamlin Lake Tourism

Bodies of water of Mason County, Michigan
Lakes of Michigan
Reservoirs in Michigan